Blake Babies were an American college rock band formed in 1986 in Boston, Massachusetts. The three primary members were John Strohm, Freda Love, and Juliana Hatfield. They recorded three albums before splitting up in 1991. They reformed to record a new album in 1999, and again in 2016.

History
The band formed in 1986, while Hatfield was studying at Berklee College of Music. The name "Blake Babies" was provided by the poet Allen Ginsberg; following a reading at Harvard University, the group (which had just begun to play together) raised their hands and asked him to name their band. Their first release was the Nicely, Nicely album, released on their own Chewbud label in 1987.

In 1989 they released the mini-LP Slow Learner on Billy Bragg's Utility label, Evan Dando of the Lemonheads (who Strohm had previously played with) joining as a temporary bassist. The band then signed to the then-independent North Carolina-based record label Mammoth Records, who issued Earwig in 1989 and Sunburn in 1990, the latter described by Allmusic as "the last great college rock album". Their final UK tour included several sold-out shows, and the band looked on the verge of a breakthrough, but they went on hiatus in 1991, with the Rosy Jack World EP released in June and Hatfield rumored to be on the brink of signing with a major label as a solo artist. The band's split was finally confirmed in early 1992.

The Blake Babies toured the United States and Europe, eventually achieving a moderate amount of notice, particularly among listeners of college age who were appreciative of the group's "intelligent" brand of rock music. The band's music received little airplay on commercial radio, instead being played primarily on college radio stations.

Andrew Mayer, Seth White, Anthony DeLuca (who played drums in place of Freda for the group's last European tour in early 1992), and Mike Leahy each also performed as members of the band at times.

Strohm and Love continued to perform together in the Indiana-based group Antenna.

The group reunited in late 1999 to record a new album, performing a few shows in 1999 and 2000 and embarking on one last US tour in 2001. The result of these recording sessions, God Bless the Blake Babies, was released in 2001 by Rounder Records.

Hatfield and Love joined up again in 2003 in the band Some Girls along with fellow musician Heidi Gluck.

In March 2016, the band announced that an album of demos recorded in March 1988 would be released (Earwig Demos), and they reunited again for three live shows that year.

Musical style
The group were compared to R.E.M. and Throwing Muses. The Washington Post'''' described them as "punkish folk-rock".

 Discography 
 Albums 
 Studio albums 

 Compilation albums 

 Extended plays 

 Singles 

DVD
 Blake Babies'' (2016)

References

External links
 

Alternative rock groups from Massachusetts
Musical groups from Boston
Musical groups established in 1986
Musical groups disestablished in 1992
Musical groups reestablished in 1999
Musical groups disestablished in 2001
Musical groups reestablished in 2016
1986 establishments in Massachusetts
Zoë Records artists